Shahid Bahonar Metro Station is a station on Isfahan Metro Line 1. The station opened on 15 October 2015. It is located at 25 Aban Square along Kaveh Boulevard in Isfahan. The next station on the north side is Shahid Chamran Station and on the south side Shohada Station.

References

Isfahan Metro stations
Railway stations opened in 2015